A metropolitan cathedral is a cathedral to which other cathedrals in a province are suffragan. See metropolitan bishop.

Metropolitan cathedral may refer to:

Asia

Our Lady of Lourdes Metropolitan Cathedral, Thrissur, India
Cebu Metropolitan Cathedral, Philippines
Jaro Cathedral or Jaro Metropolitan Cathedral, Iloilo City, Philippines
Palo Metropolitan Cathedral, Philippines
Metropolitan Cathedral of San Fernando (Pampanga), City of San Fernando, Pampanga, Philippines
Metropolitan Cathedral of the Immaculate Conception (Zamboanga), Philippines

Europe
Liverpool Metropolitan Cathedral, England
Metropolitan Cathedral of Athens, Greece
Metropolitan Cathedral of Saint Paul, Mdina, Malta

North America

Cathedral of Sts. Vladimir and Olga, a cathedral in Manitoba, Canada
Metropolitan Cathedral of San José, Costa Rica
San Salvador Metropolitan Cathedral, El Salvador
Metropolital Cathedral of Guatemala, Guatemala City
Mexico City Metropolitan Cathedral
Immaculate Conception Cathedral, Managua (Catedral Metropolitana de la Inmaculada Concepción de María), Managua, Nicaragua
Catedral Metropolitana Basílica de San Juan Bautista (San Juan, Puerto Rico), San Juan, Puerto Rico

South America

Buenos Aires Metropolitan Cathedral, Argentina
Metropolitan Cathedral of Saint Sebastian, Cochabamba, Bolivia
Cathedral of Brasília, Brasília, Brazil, (officially Metropolitan Cathedral of Brasília)
Metropolitan Cathedral of Our Lady of the Conception, Manaus, Brazil
Santiago Metropolitan Cathedral, Chile
Metropolitan Cathedral of Medellín, Colombia (largest cathedral in South America)
Metropolitan Cathedral of Quito, Ecuador
Montevideo Metropolitan Cathedral, Uruguay